The Octopus Frontier is a 1960 poetry collection by American writer Richard Brautigan. It is Brautigan's fourth poetry publication and his second collection of poetry, and includes 22 poems.

Contents
The Octopus Frontier includes 22 poems:

All but 5 of the poems were republished in the 1968 collection, The Pill versus the Springhill Mine Disaster.

Reception
In the Dictionary of Literary Biography, Caroline Bokinsky said the collection "continues Brautigan's creation of order and meaning from objects in the literal world by using them to construct a fantasy world within his own imagination." Citing several examples, she describes the ways in which Brautigan makes connections and associations to lead readers through his imagination, acting "as a painter, in a meticulous step-by-step process, putting each object in a specific place to create a painting."

Fellow poet Richard McClure said the poems "are filled with large simple images of vegetables and pumpkins floating on the tide, a poem about Ophelia, and poems about childhood." According to McClure, it was at this point in Brautigan's writing that there emerged "a recognizable Brautigan style [...] but there is no indication that this work is greatly above the level of much North Beach poetry."

Cover
The Octopus Frontier is the first Brautigan work to feature a photograph on the cover. The image, by San Francisco-based photographer Gui de Angelo, shows a person's feet standing on a six-foot octopus tentacle Brautigan bought for the purpose from a Chinatown fishmonger and carried to the roof of a building in North Beach. It has been described as being "striking and just misses being sinister".

References

External links
 includes listing of contents, text of poems, and commentary

American poetry collections
Works by Richard Brautigan
1960 poetry books